The 2023 European Championship is the 16th European Championship in American football. The preliminary round will be played around Europe from 8 October to 5 November 2022. The final round will be played in August and October 2023.

Group A, first round
First round will be played around Europe from 8 October to 5 November 2022. First round will see 11 teams divided to four groups. Russia was due to be the 12th nation participating as the 3rd team in group 1 but nation was removed from the tournament due to ongoing Russian invasion of Ukraine. Russia's games were removed from the schedule.

Division A

Division B

Division C

Division D

Group A, final stage
The final round will be contested in August and October 2023.

1–4

5–8

9–11

Group B

See also
International Federation of American Football

References

2023
2023 in American football
August 2023 sports events in Europe
October 2023 sports events in Europe